Vågsbygd High School is a high school in Kristiansand, Norway. The school is located at the centrum of the borough Vågsbygd at Kristin Flagstads vei. The school has over 800 students.

References

External links
 

Secondary schools in Norway